Bartlett Independent School District is a public school district based in Bartlett, Texas (USA).  Located in Bell County, portions of the district extend into Williamson and Milam counties.

Finances
As of the 2010-2011 school year, the appraised valuation of property in the district was $86,161,000. The maintenance tax rate was $0.104 and the bond tax rate was $0.011 per $100 of appraised valuation.

Academic achievement
In 2011, the school district was rated "academically acceptable" by the Texas Education Agency.

Schools
In 2011-2012, the district had three schools.

Regular instructional
Bartlett School (Grades PK-12)

JJAEP instructional
Williamson County JJAEP
Bell County JJAEP

Closed schools
Bartlett Elementary School.
The elementary school was last given separate accountability ratings in 2007.

See also

List of school districts in Texas

References

External links

School districts in Bell County, Texas
School districts in Williamson County, Texas
School districts in Milam County, Texas